Michelle Ring  (born 28 November 1967) is a Canadian soccer player who played as a defender for the Canada women's national soccer team. She was part of the team at the 1995 FIFA Women's World Cup. In 2005, she was inducted into the Canadian Soccer Hall of Fame.

References

External links
 
 / Canada Soccer Hall of Fame

1967 births
Living people
Canadian women's soccer players
Canada women's international soccer players
Place of birth missing (living people)
1995 FIFA Women's World Cup players
Women's association football defenders
Canada Soccer Hall of Fame inductees